Jay Alexander (born April 10, 1968) is an American magician and comedian known as a corporate and society entertainer. He has appeared on The Today Show, Good Morning America and MTV, and also on many local morning shows. 

In the San Francisco Chronicle, David Lazarus wrote, "One of the highest-paid, and busiest, performers on the Bay Area corporate circuit is magician Jay Alexander . . ."

Alexander creates customized shows for Fortune 500 companies and is a consultant and co-author of several magic books. Alexander is also the host of Learn the Art of Magic, a CD-ROM that introduces 26 different magic tricks. At the age of fourteen, he became the youngest recipient of the Society of American Magicians' Gold Medal of Honor.

His clients have included Robin Williams, Steve Wozniak and the Rolling Stones.

Jay Alexander directed the notable children's DVD "Here Comes Boswick the Clown with Phoebe the Duck!", produced by  David Magidson.

Alexander was born in Houston, Texas. He is the great grandson of the vaudeville performer, Gentleman Ben Darwin. As a child, Alexander found a trunk in his grandparents' attic filled with gear for magic and escapes. His interest in magic took off from there. His grandfather, Joseph Pfeffer (1917-2014), was a World War II veteran who served in the United States Marine Corps who went on to become a Holocaust artist and poet.
At the age of fourteen, Alexander was honored to be the youngest recipient of the Society of American Magicians Gold Medal of Honor. He attended Westbury High School then the High School for the Performing and Visual Arts in Houston.

After high school, Alexander moved to San Francisco to attend the San Francisco Art Institute, perform, and be part of the art and music scene of the Haight-Ashbury.

References

External links
Jay Alexander official site

1968 births
Living people
Entertainers from Houston
American magicians
High School for the Performing and Visual Arts alumni